Salient may refer to:
 Salient (military), a battlefield feature that projects into enemy territory
 Salient (geography), an elongated protrusion of a territory
 Salient (heraldry), an adjective describing a heraldic beast in a leaping attitude
 Salient pole, a projecting electromagnetic pole of a field coil
 SALIENT, SALt Irradiation ExperimeNT, a thorium molten salt reactor
 Salient (magazine), Victoria University of Wellington student publication
 Salient Software, a utility software company between 1990 and 1992, taken over by Fifth Generation Systems, meanwhile Symantec / Norton
 Salient Partners, an asset management firm
 Salient CRGT, a US government IT services firm based in Fairfax, Virginia

See also
 Salience (disambiguation)